4 Clubbers is a German trance music group, best known for their cover of the song "Children".

Discography

Singles 
 2001: "Children" - UK #45
 2002: "Someday"
 2002: "Together"
 2003: "Why Don't You Dance with Me"
 2004: "Elements of Culture"
 2004: "Secrets" / "Sonar"
 2006: "Let Me Be Your Fantasy"
 2007: "Time" (featuring Silvy De Bie)
 2008: "Try and Try" (featuring Damae)

Sampler 
 2002: Frankfurt Trance 9

References

External links 
 Profile at Discogs

German trance music groups
Musical groups established in 2001
Electronic dance music groups